Duke Nicholas IV of Opava (– 1437) was Duke of Opava and Lord of Zlaté Hory from 1433 until his death.

Life 
His parents were Duke Przemko I of Opava (d. 1433) and his first wife Anna of Lutz (d. 1405).

His father died in 1433 and left five sons.  Nicholas IV, the second son, styled himself as Lord of Zlaté Hory.  His elder brother Wenceslaus II acted as guardian for his younger half-brothers William, Ernest and Przemko II.  Although their father had stipulated in his will that his Duchy should remain undivided, in 1435 the brothers divided the inheritance anyway.  The Duchy of Głubczyce was split off from Opava for Wenceslaus II.  Nicholas kept Zlaté Hory; William and Ernest shared the rest of Opava.  The youngest brother, Przemko II, took up a career in the clergy and probably did not receive any land.

Nicholas IV died in 1437 unmarried and without issue.  His eldest brother, Wenceslaus II, probably inherited Zlaté Hory.

References 
 Ludwig Petry et al.: Geschichte Schlesiens, vol. 1, Sigmaringen, 1988, p. 191
 Hugo Weczerka (ed.): Handbuch der historischen Stätten — Schlesien, Stuttgart, 1977, Genealogical tables on p. 600/601

External links

Footnotes 

Opavian Přemyslids
1400 births
Year of birth uncertain
1437 deaths
15th-century German people

cs:Václav II. Opavský